The year 1668 in music involved some significant events.

Events 
Dietrich Buxtehude becomes organist at the Marienkirche in Lübeck.
Joseph Haines joins the troupe of performers at Hatton Garden, London.
Antonio Draghi is appointed to the court of Leopold I, Holy Roman Emperor, at Vienna.

Publications 
Dietrich Becker – Musikalische Frühlings-Früchte
Richard Duckworth's Tintinnalogia, or, the Art of Ringing, the first work on change ringing, is compiled and published complete by Fabian Stedman in London.
Thomas Tomkins' Musica Deo Sacra is published posthumously by his son, Nathaniel.
Gaspar de Verlit – Missae et motettae nec non quator antiphonae B. Mariae Virginis, vol. 2

Classical music 

 Christoph Bernhard -- Ach mein herzliebes Jesulein (and other portions of Geistlicher Harmonien Erster Teil)
 Heinrich Ignaz Franz von Biber -- Sonata à 7
Dietrich Buxtehude -- All solch dein Güt wir preisen, BuxWV 3
 Francesco Cavalli -- O bone Jesu 
Maurizio Cazzati – Canzonette a voce sola, libro 5, Op.46
 Henry DuMont -- Motets à deux voix, avec la basse-continue
Lambert Pietkin -- Sacri concentus, Op. 3
Johann Schmelzer - Harmonia à 5

Opera
Antonio Cesti – Il pomo d'oro (premiered July 12 or 14 in Vienna)
Antonio Draghi – Achille riconsciuto
Jacopo Melani – Il Girello
Jean-Baptist Lully 
Le carnaval, LWV 36
George Dandin
La Grotte de Versailles
Francesco Feo -- Andromaca

Births 
January 8 – Jean Gilles, composer (died 1705)
June 19 – Georg von Bertouch, composer (died 1743)
September 13 – Luca Antonio Predieri, composer (died 1767)
October 29 – Joseph-François Duché de Vancy, librettist (died 1704)
November 10 – François Couperin, French organist and composer (died 1733)
November 27 – Pantaleon Hebenstreit, German dance teacher, musician, composer and inventor of the pantalon (died 1750)
December 11 – Apostolo Zeno, Venetian librettist (died 1750)
date unknown – John Eccles, English composer (died 1735)

Deaths 
March 7 – Odoardo Ceccarelli, Italian singer and composer (born  1600)
April 7 – Sir William Davenant, English poet and playwright, author of The Siege of Rhodes, considered the first opera in English (born 1606)
October 23 – Giovanni Rovetta, Venetian composer (born 1596)
August 9 – Jacob Balde, German New Latin poet and lyricist (born 1604)
December 2 – Albertus Bryne, English composer and organist (born 1621)
date unknown 
Nicolas Métru, French organist, violist, and composer (born 1610)
Francesco Sbarra, dramatist, poet, and librettist (born 1611)

References